Gahvareh District is a district (bakhsh) in Dalahu County, Kermanshah Province, Iran. At the 2006 census, its population was 20,576, in 4,600 families.  The District has one city: Gahvareh. The District has two rural districts (dehestan): Gurani Rural District and Qalkhani Rural District.

References 

Dalahu County
Districts of Kermanshah Province